Finnegan Begin Again is a 1985 American made-for-HBO romantic comedy film directed by Joan Micklin Silver, shot by Robby Müller, and starring Mary Tyler Moore and Robert Preston.  The movie was filmed in the Fan District of Richmond, Virginia and premiered on HBO on February 24, 1985, before being released on video.  The supporting cast features Sam Waterston and Sylvia Sidney.

Plot
Michael Finnegan, a past-his-prime journalist, has been relegated to ghost-writing "Dear Felicity", a column for the lovelorn. He and his wife live in a decaying neighborhood. She is long despondent over the loss of their young son, and lives in a fantasy world. Despite these reversals, Finnegan retains his optimism; he knows that lives can start over, and over. He gets his own chance to begin again when one day on the bus, he meets Liz DeHaan, an art teacher who is having an affair with a married man.

Cast
Mary Tyler Moore  ...  Liz DeHaan  
Robert Preston  ...  Mike Finnegan  
Sam Waterston  ...  Paul Broadbent  
Sylvia Sidney  ...  Margaret Finnegan  
David Huddleston  ...  Jack Archer  
Bob Gunton  ...  Christian Jamison  
Giancarlo Esposito  ...  Intruder  
Russell Horton  ...  Mort  
Avery Brooks  ...  Dude on Bus  
Peter Friedman  ...  John Jewell  
Jon DeVries  ...  Dr. Binder  
Rick Warner ... Charlie DeWitt

Home media
The film was released on VHS by Thorn EMI/HBO Video under license from Home Box Office. However, it never released on DVD or Blu-ray.

References

External links

HBO Films films
1985 films
1985 television films
Films shot in Virginia
American romantic comedy films
American drama television films
1980s English-language films
1980s American films